Tiago Florêncio Bueno (born 21 February 1983, in Campinas) is a Brazilian athlete specialising in the 400 metres hurdles. He won several medals on the regional level.

His personal best in the event is 49.59, set in 2005.

Competition record

References

1983 births
Living people
Sportspeople from Campinas
Brazilian male hurdlers
21st-century Brazilian people